"My Girlfriend's Girlfriend" is a song from American gothic metal band Type O Negative's 1996 album October Rust. The first single off of the aforementioned album, it describes a polyamorous relationship. According to an interview in Livewire, it was written at bandmate Josh Silver's house in a short amount of time. With its prominent organ and the almost lighthearted mood throughout, the song much more closely resembles 1960s psychedelic rock than the doom metal that prevails for most of the album.

Tracklist
All songs written by Peter Steele except where noted.

Credits
 Peter Steele – lead vocals, bass guitar, additional guitar
 Kenny Hickey – guitars, backing vocals
 Josh Silver – keyboards, organ, backing vocals
 Johnny Kelly – drums
 Richard Kern – cover

Charts and certifications

Weekly singles charts

References

External links
 

Type O Negative songs
1996 songs
Songs about friendship
Songs written by Peter Steele
LGBT-related songs
Roadrunner Records singles